The Making of the Representative for Planet 8 is a full-scale opera by Philip Glass with a libretto by Doris Lessing based on her novel of the same name, first performed in 1988. Together with Glass's 1997 opera The Marriages Between Zones Three, Four and Five, it is part of a planned trilogy of operas based on Lessing's Canopus in Argos novels.

The opera was co-commissioned by English National Opera, Houston Grand Opera, Het Muziektheater, Amsterdam, and Theater Kiel, and co-produced with Artpark, Lewiston, New York State.

Performance history
The opera was first performed at Houston Grand Opera on 8 July 1988. The British premiere was 9 November 1988 by English National Opera at the London Coliseum. This production was broadcast live in the UK on BBC Radio 3 on 13 December 1988.

Roles

Synopsis
The people of Planet 8 are peaceful and content, until one of the Canopean Agents arrives and tells them to prepare for an impending ice age. The embattled population fights courageously in the face of certain death, and their efforts are transformed when they become the one single "representative" of the planet's people and culture.

Recordings
Unlike many of Philip Glass's other operas, The Making of the Representative for Planet 8 has not been recorded for CD sale.

References

External links
Dedicated page on the official web site of Philip Glass
Details of the opera, including production photographs, dorislessing.org
"Reviews/Music; New Opera By Lessing And Glass" by John Rockwell, The New York Times, 11 July 1988

1988 operas
Fiction set around Canopus
Opera world premieres at Houston Grand Opera
Minimalist operas
Operas
Operas by Philip Glass
Science fiction operas
Operas based on novels
Works by Doris Lessing
Works set on fictional planets